Foothills Academy has been out of business for several years

Foothill Academy is a private school in Wheat Ridge, Colorado. It offers pre-kindergarten through Grade 12. The school was founded in 1984.

External links 
Foothills Academy Official site.
 Greatschools Webpage

Educational institutions established in 1984
Private high schools in Colorado
Schools in Jefferson County, Colorado
Private middle schools in Colorado
Private elementary schools in Colorado
1984 establishments in Colorado